Manuel Ernesto  is a Mozambican Anglican bishop: he was previously Suffragan Bishop of Diocese of Niassa and since 2019 the inaugural bishop of the Missionary Diocese of Nampula.

References

Living people
Mozambican Anglicans
Anglican bishops of Niassa
21st-century Anglican bishops in Africa
Year of birth missing (living people)
Anglican bishops of Nampula